University Esports is a collegiate esports partnership headquartered in the offices of GGTech Entertainment in Alicante, Spain. The partnership was founded in February 2020 with the support of American technology company Amazon. It includes collegiate hosts GGTech, the NUEL, and PG Esports, of Spain, the United Kingdom and Italy respectively.

Sponsorship
University Esports sponsors tournaments for League of Legends, Teamfight Tactics and Clash Royale. In the UK, they also sponsor the NUEL's tournaments for Counter-Strike: Global Offensive and Tom Clancy's Rainbow Six Siege.

Intel sponsors University Esports in Turkey; the organization holds events in League Of Legends and Valorant in the region.

References

External links
Amazon University Esports Official Website
s1n: "Our ambition is to be the best Academy Team in the world"

Amazon (company)
2020 establishments in Spain
Sports organizations established in 2020
Esports governing bodies
Esports in Spain
Esports in the United Kingdom
Esports in Italy